Boris Becker and Guy Forget were the defending champions but only Becker competed that year with Jakob Hlasek.

Becker and Hlasek won in the final 7–6, 7–5 against Kevin Curren and David Pate.

Seeds
The top four seeded teams received byes into the second round.

Draw

Finals

Top half

Bottom half

References
 1989 Newsweek Champions Cup Doubles Draw

Newsweek Champions Cup Doubles